ISPOR—The Professional Society for Health Economics and Outcomes Research, better known as ISPOR (formerly, the International Society for Pharmacoeconomics and Outcomes Research), is a nonprofit global professional organization in health economics and outcomes research. It was founded in 1995 as an international multidisciplinary professional organization that advances the policy, science, and practice of pharmacoeconomics (health economics) and outcomes research (the scientific discipline that evaluates the effect of healthcare interventions on patient well-being including clinical, economic, and patient-centered outcomes). The society's mission is to promote health economics and outcomes research to improve decision making for health globally.

As of January 2022, the society has 14,000 individual and chapter members from more than countries with a majority in North America (41%) followed by Europe (37%), Asia Pacific (11%), Latin America (5%), Africa & Oceania (4%), and Middle East (2%).

Contributions 
ISPOR has contributed to the health economics and outcomes research literature by developing good practices reports for health economics and outcomes research. These reports encompass a wide-array of guidance for research including, real-world evidence, health technology assessment, comparative effectiveness research methods, economic evaluation methods, budget impact analysis, modeling methods, observational study methods-database methods, observational study methods-medication adherence methods, clinical outcomes assessment methods, preference-based methods, risk benefits methods, and use of outcomes research in health care decisions.

The society collaborated with the Society for Medical Decision Making to develop a comprehensive list of papers that outline the ideal practice for develop decision analytic models for pharmacoeconomic analysis. The society has also collaborated with the Academy of Managed Care Pharmacy to develop guidelines for training programs and fellowships for future professionals in pharmacoeconomics and outcomes research.

An increasing number of new pharmaceuticals have used questionnaires to capture Patient-reported outcome (PROs) of health care as a metric to complement their clinical effectiveness. These PROs require stringent reliability testing and validation, necessitating standardization for their development and use. The International Society for Quality of Life Research (ISOQOL) developed a minimum set of measurement standards to properly use PRO instruments. Moreover, ISPOR developed a set of standards to properly test these instruments for reliability and validity, which has been adopted by the Food and Drug Administration (FDA). Currently, the FDA refers to the ISPOR Task Force's publications on content validity for the development of new clinical outcome assessment instruments or tools. In terms of breast cancer research, a recent paper from ISPOR highlights the importance of patient reported outcome measures (PROMs) to determine outcomes from the patients' perspective. These measures provide information regarding the patient's symptoms and distress while informing decision-makers about the effectiveness of the treatment strategy. Most importantly, communication between the physician and patient improved once the treatment strategy is PROM-based.

In 2019, ISPOR released a series of papers that document how decision makers assess healthcare value. The National Pharmaceutical Council, Institute for Clinical and Economic Review, and the National Health Council have developed value-assessment frameworks to help guide decision makers and stakeholders to value healthcare. ISPOR's value-assessment framework focuses on patient centricity and the use of cost-effectiveness analysis where the costs of the intervention are compared to standard of care in terms of costs and quality-adjusted life years (QALYs). However criticisms of the use of a QALY-centric approach due to the limitations associated with these metrics have been voiced. Most recently, the society commented on the American Society of Clinical Oncology value framework for new oncology treatment because it did not embrace the use of QALYs. Regardless, QALYs continue to remain an important metric in healthcare decision making and price negotiations.

In 2018, ISPOR created a Patient Council that includes patient representatives to advise the advisory board in healthcare research and decision making.

Since the passage of the 21st Century Cures Act in 2016, the FDA has established the Real World Evidence program to help facilitate the approval process for drugs already approved under 505(c) of the Federal Food, Drug, and Cosmetic Act. The FDA will use recommendations from the ISPOR—The Professional Society for Health Economics and Outcomes Research and the International Society for Pharmacoepidemiology (ISPE) to develop a set of standards that would use good procedural practices for treatment effectiveness studies, including transparency and reproducibility.

ISPOR hosts multiple conferences, summits, and other events throughout the year in the North America, Europe, and virtually. On September 29, 2020, the organization held a joint summit with the Food and Drug Administration on the topic of patient preference information in medical device regulatory decisions. The event was supported by grants from CVRx Inc., Edwards Lifesciences and Evidation Health.

Publications 
ISPOR is the publisher of the international, peer-reviewed journal Value in Health, which publishes "articles for pharmacoeconomics, health economics, and outcomes research (clinical, economic, and patient-reported outcomes/preference-based research), as well as conceptual and health policy articles that provide valuable information for health care decision-makers, as well as the research community. As the official journal of the society, it provides a forum for researchers, as well as health care decision-makers, to translate outcomes research into health care decisions." The society also publishes Value In Health Regional Issues, which focuses on encouraging and enhancing "the science of pharmacoeconomic/health economic and health outcomes research and its use in health care decisions in Asia, Latin America, Central & Eastern Europe, Western Asia, and Africa." Value in Health has an current impact factor of 4.748 (in 2019) and is 7th among 102 journals in Health Care Sciences and Services, 5th among 87 journals in Health Policy and Services, and 19th among 371 journals in Economics.

Awards and Accolades 
In 2016, Nancy Berg, ISPOR's current CEO, was selected to be part of the 2016 PharmVOICE 100, which recognizes those "inspirational individuals recognized for their positive contributions to the life sciences industry".

ISPOR received the "Power of A" Silver Award for its Good Practices for Outcomes Research Reports in 2018.

ISPOR is a member of the National Health Council, a nonprofit association of health organizations that represents the patient voice.

References

External links

Lawrence Township, Mercer County, New Jersey
Research institutes established in 1995
1995 establishments in New Jersey
Non-profit organizations based in New Jersey